Sociophysiology is the "interplay between society and physical functioning" (Freund 1988: 856) involving "collaboration of two neighboring sciences: physiology and sociology" (Mauss 1936: 373). In other words, sociophysiology is physiological sociology, a special science that studies the physiological side of human (and other animals') interrelations (Zeliony 1912: 405–406).

Interdisciplinary field of research
In addition to having been termed an "interdisciplinary area for research, an area which demonstrates the concomitant relationship between physiology and social behavior" (Di Mascio et al. 1955: 4), sociophysiology may also be described as "social ethology" and "social energetics" (Waxweiler 1906: 62). That is, the "physiology of reactive phenomena caused by the mutual excitations of individuals of the same species" (Waxweiler 1906: 62).

The interdisciplinary nature of sociophysiology largely entails a "synthesis of psychophysiology and social interaction" (Adler 2002: 884) such that a "socio-psycho-biological study" (Mauss 1936: 386) of "biologico-sociological phenomena" (Mauss 1936: 385) may ensue. Such "socio-psycho-biological study" has uncovered a "sharing of physiology between people involved in a meaningful interaction" (Adler 2002: 884), as well as "mutually responsive physiologic engagement having normative function in maintaining social cohesion and well-being in higher social animals" (Adler 2002: 885). This "mutually responsive physiologic engagement" brings into play the "close links uniting social phenomena to the biological phenomena from which they immediately derive" (Solvay 1906: 26).

Interpersonal physiology
Furthermore, sociophysiology explores the "intimate relationship and mutual regulation between social and physiological systems that is especially vital in human groups" (Barchas 1986: 210). In other words, sociophysiology studies the "physio- and psycho-energetic phenomena at the basis of social groupings" (Solvay 1906: 25). Along these lines, Zeliony (1912) noted that

In addition, sociophysiology "describes structure-function relationships for body structures and interactive functions relevant to psychiatric illness" (Gardner 1997: 351), and also "assumes that psychiatric disorders are pathological variants of the motivation, emotions, and conflict involved in normal communicational processes" (Gardner and Price 1999: 247–248). Psychiatry, thus, involves the diagnosis and treatment of what Lilienfeld (1879: 280) termed "physiological social pathology", and may be classed as a subfield of sociophysiology, called "pathological sociophysiology" by Zeliony (1912: 405). As summarized by Ellwood (1916), Zeliony thought that, in the future,

Ellwood (1916: 298) also noted that Zeliony's future sociophysiology, being a natural biological science, must be Darwinian.

In short, sociophysiology is "reciprocal, interpersonal physiology" (Adler 2002: 885). Such interpersonal physiology may have implications in the realm of human politics. For example, the findings of a recent study "suggest that political attitudes vary with physiological traits linked to divergent manners of experiencing and processing environmental threats" (Oxley et al. 2008: 1669).

Notes and references

Notes

References
Adler, H. M. (2002). The sociophysiology of caring in the doctor–patient relationship. Journal of General Internal Medicine, vol. 17, no. 11, pp. 883–890.
Barchas, P. R. (1986). A sociophysiological orientation to small groups. In E. J. Lawler, ed., Advances in Group Processes, vol. 3, pp. 209–246. Greenwich, CT: JAI Press.
Di Mascio, A., Boyd, R. W., Greenblatt, M., and H. C. Solomon. (1955). The psychiatric interview (a sociophysiologic study). Diseases of the Nervous System, vol. 16, no. 1, pp. 4–9.
Ellwood, C. A. (1916). Objectivism in sociology. American Journal of Sociology, vol. 22, no. 3, pp. 289–305.
Freund, P. E. S. (1988). Bringing society into the body: Understanding socialized human nature. Theory and Society, vol. 17, no. 6, pp. 839–864.
Gardner Jr., R. J. (1997). Sociophysiology as the basic science of psychiatry. Theoretical Medicine, vol. 18, no. 4, pp. 335–356.
Gardner Jr., R. J., and J. S. Price. (1999). Sociophysiology and depression. In T. E. Joiner and J. C. Coyne, eds., The Interactional Nature of Depression: Advances in Interpersonal Approaches. Washington, DC: American Psychological Association.
Lilienfeld, P. (1879). Die sociale Physiologie. Volume 4 of Gedanken über die Socialwissenschaft der Zukunft. Mitau: E. Behre's Verlag.
Mauss, M. (1936). Les techniques du corps. Journal de Psychologie, vol. 32, nos. 3–4, 15 mars – 15 avril 1936. Reprinted in M. Mauss, Sociologie et anthropologie, Paris: PUF, 1950, pp. xxx-xxx. 
Oxley, D. R. et al. (2008). Political attitudes vary with physiological traits. Science 19 September 2008: Vol. 321. no. 5896, pp. 1667–1670.  
Solvay, E. (1906). Note sur des formules d’introduction à l’énergétique physio- et psycho-sociologique. Fascicule 1 des Notes et Mémoires de l’Institut de Sociologie, Instituts Solvay, Parc Léopold, Bruxelles. Bruxelles et Leipzig: Misch et Thron.
Waxweiler, E. (1906). Esquisse d’une sociologie. Fascicule 2 des Notes et Mémoires de l’Institut de Sociologie, Instituts Solvay, Parc Léopold, Bruxelles. Bruxelles et Leipzig: Misch et Thron.
Zeliony, G. P. (1912). Über die zukünftige Soziophysiologie. Archiv für Rassen- und Gesellschafts-Biologie, vol. 9, no. 4, pp. 405–429.

Further reading
Barchas, P. R., ed. (1984). Social Hierarchies: Essays Toward a Sociophysiological Perspective. Westport, CT: Greenwood.
Barchas, P. R. and S. P. Mendoza, eds. (1984). Social Cohesion: Essays Toward a Sociophysiological Perspective. Westport, CT: Greenwood.
Buytendijk, F. J. (1974). Prolegomena to an Anthropological Physiology. Pittsburgh: Duquesne University Press.
Gardner Jr., R. J. and D. R. Wilson. (2004). Sociophysiology and evolutionary aspects of psychiatry. In J. Panksepp, ed., Textbook of Biological Psychiatry. Wiley. 
Mysterud, I. (2004). One name for the evolutionary baby? A preliminary guide for everyone confused by the chaos of names. Social Science Information, vol. 43, no. 1, pp. 95–114.
Perec, G. (1976) Lire: esquisse socio-physiologique. Esprit, no. 453, pp. 9–20. Reprinted in G. Perec, Penser/Classer, Paris: Hachette, 1985.
Reinheimer, H. (1920). Symbiosis: A Socio-physiological Study of Evolution. London: Headley Brothers. (Reinheimer seems to use the term "socio-physiology" as a synonym for "eugenics," which usage differs vastly from that of other writers, both early and late.) 
Waid, W. M., ed. (1984). Sociophysiology. New York: Springer Verlag.

See also
Biological psychology
Ethology
Physiological psychology
Psychophysiology
Social interaction
Social psychology
Sociobiology
G. P. Zeliony

External links
Biozentrum Universität Würzburg: Research: Behavioral Physiology and Sociobiology. 
Universität Bayreuth, Studies on behavioural ecology and sociophysiology in European rabbits. 
Hominisation-Anton Fürlinger, Social Brain and Sociophysiology. 
The Institute of Sociophysiology takes a pataphysical approach to the subject. 

Behavioural sciences
Ethology
Sociobiology
Physiology